The West Central Illinois Educational Telecommunications Corporation was incorporated on February 9, 1976.  Its membership was a consortium of Educational Institutions in West-Central Illinois.  Bradley University in Peoria, Western Illinois University in Macomb, Blackhawk Community College in Moline, and Sangamon State University in Springfield. 
Its mission was "to establish an educational television network, provide educational content, create local and public affairs programming to serve the residents and businesses of west-central Illinois". Bylaws for the corporation were approved on January 13, 1984.

The brand name Convocom was adopted in 1978 for the corporation and its offices were established on West Bradley Avenue in Peoria.

History

Educational television in Illinois
After World War II, the University of Illinois Urbana-Champaign hosted the National Association of Educational Broadcasters (NAEB). NAEB was created to establish broadcast allocations of AM and FM radio and TV channels for non-commercial educational programming. The Rockefeller Foundation funded two-week seminars in 1949 (Allerton I) and 1950 (Allerton II); these seminars consisted of 22 educational broadcasters from across the United States. The meetings established the foundation for National Public Radio (NPR) and the Public Broadcasting Service (PBS). The NAEB was based in Urbana, Illinois, from 1951 until 1961, when it moved to Washington, D.C.

The University of Illinois applied for a television license soon after the Federal Communications Commission (FCC) lifted its freeze on new licenses (July 1, 1952). Educational television was a new concept at the time, and most of Illinois' commercial broadcasters opposed the prospect of the University of Illinois owning a television station. A bill that would have forced the University to withdraw its application for the television license was narrowly defeated in the Illinois legislature. Afterward, the Illinois Broadcasters Association (ILBA) funded a suit by a restaurant owner in Evanston, Illinois, claiming that the Illinois Constitution did not allow the University of Illinois to operate a television station. The case went all the way to the Illinois Supreme Court, which ruled in favor of the University of Illinois' application for the television license. Because of this, educational broadcasting in downstate Illinois was delayed for fifteen years, while other states proceeded with development.

Establishing an educational consortium
In 1970, the west-central region of Illinois was one of the few areas in the United States without a PBS station. Commercial broadcast television networks and their local affiliates in the west-central Illinois region provided some educational programming for children in the 1950s and 1960s, but this content disappeared by 1970.  Parts of the region were served from WILL-TV in Urbana, WTVP in Peoria, and Iowa Public Television outlet KIIN-TV in Iowa City. Cable television systems in north-central Illinois and Macomb carried Iowa Public Television or Peoria's WTVP, while WILL-TV was piped in by cable systems in Springfield. When WTVP signed on from Peoria in 1971, Quincy, the second-largest city in west-central Illinois, was one of the few portions of the nation without access to public television.

A number of meetings were held with civic organizations, businesses, elected public representatives, and private and public educational institutions from 1970 to 1976. The outcome of these discussions was the establishment of the West Central Illinois Educational Telecommunications Corporation, incorporated on February 9, 1976. It was a consortium of Bradley University in Peoria, Western Illinois University in Macomb, Blackhawk Community College in Moline, and Sangamon State University in Springfield. Its mission was "to establish an educational television network, provide educational content, create local and public affairs programming to serve the residents and businesses of west-central Illinois". Bylaws for the corporation were approved on January 13, 1984.

The brand name Convocom was adopted in 1978 for the corporation and its offices were established on West Bradley Avenue in Peoria. George Hall was appointed as the first president that same year. He had previously served as general manager for North Carolina State University's educational television station.

Initial engineering design and FCC application filings were performed in 1977 and 1978 by Gary Breed and Don Markley of D.L. Markley and Associates, in Peoria, a well-known broadcast engineering consulting firm. Breed was a faculty member of Bradley University's Engineering department and Markley, president and owner of the firm, grew up in Ipava, Illinois.

The original television network design for Convocom would encompass five broadcast transmitters. Peoria's WTVP would be the flagship station, with WQPT-TV in Moline, WIUM-TV in Macomb, WQEC in Quincy, and WJPT in Jacksonville (serving Springfield) as satellites. The master control would be located at Convocom headquarters in Peoria, at or near the flagship station of the proposed network WTVP, with three microwave interconnections (links) in the Quad Cities, Macomb–Quincy, and Jacksonville–Springfield.

The D. L. Markley design was a balance of engineering, economics, and the service region of the education institution members in the largely rural west-central Illinois region. Larger urban areas in the region were considered crucial for ongoing community support and sufficient financial support (grants, fundraising) to cover operational costs of the non-commercial educational network.

West Central Illinois Educational TV Network (Convocom) was presented to regional representatives, educational institutions, major businesses, civic and community organizations in 1977 and 1978:

Notes:
 1. WJPT planned to use the  WJJY-TV tower at Bluffs, Illinois. That tower collapsed on March 26, 1978, in an ice storm. A new  tower site west of Waverly was selected and began broadcasting August 11, 1984.
 2. WQEC was added to the original design in 1979 since the new WJPT tower at 800 to 1,000 feet (eventually located in Waverly) would not provide coverage to the Quincy and Hannibal market.

Convocom
The first new Convocom station, WJPT in Jacksonville, planned to sign on in 1979 using a  tower near Bluffs, Illinois, that had previously been used by ABC affiliate WJJY-TV. The station was intended to serve both Quincy and Springfield. However, the tower collapsed in a massive ice storm early on the morning of March 26, 1978. Constructing a replacement  tower at the Bluffs site by April 1979 would require $1 million, well beyond Convocom's original budget. Due to changes in the anticipated regional coverage from that location, Convocom sought and received a license for a fourth station, WQEC, to serve the Quincy/Hannibal market. In the summer of 1978, it also began surveying a replacement tower site for WJPT.

Since the 1960s, Western Illinois University (WIU) had been surveying tower sites for a planned educational television station and relocation of the university's FM station, WIUM, a  guyed radio tower erected in 1956. The tower was located next to Sallee Hall in the middle of the university's rapidly expanding campus. In 1976, after examining a number of sites south of Macomb, WIU selected a tower site on land bequeathed to the university by Jack Horn, regional Coca-Cola bottler. Then, in 1977, WIU and Convocom agreed to co-locate the television station, WIUM-TV, and supporting microwave relay network on this same tower. Construction of a new  tower was completed in 1980 and WIUM's transmitters were relocated to the site in 1981. Two microwave relay towers were constructed in 1983 between Peoria and Quincy at Cuba, Illinois, and Carthage, Illinois, for master control, PBS program feeds, local program feeds, and TV studios at WIU in Macomb and at WGEM-TV in Quincy.

By 1983, a site west of Waverly was selected as the site for an  tower for WJPT. However, for reasons that remain unknown, the FCC only licensed WJPT for 34 kilowatts of broadcast power at that specific location. As a result, WJPT only had a fringe (grade B) signal in Springfield, leaving it all but unviewable in the capital except on cable. A site east of Quincy owned by Blackhawk of Quincy, Inc. was selected for a new  tower for WQEC. Convocom had to raise $5.5 million to complete construction of these planned and unplanned replacement facilities.

George Hall resigned as President of Convocom in 1982 to serve as Virginia's Director of Telecommunications under Governor Chuck Robb. The consortium appointed Dr. Jerold Gruebel as the Executive Director of Convocom in April 1983. Dr. Grubel had previously served as the assistant director of Indiana Higher Education Telecommunications System (IHETS)—a statewide network of video, voice, and data networks connecting all 77 of Indiana's colleges and universities with headquarters in Indianapolis.

WQPT in Moline signed on November 2, 1983, to serve the Quad Cities metropolitan area, east-central Iowa, and north-western Illinois through a translator (channel 48) in Sterling, Illinois. WQPT, owned and operated by Black Hawk College, elected to develop its own brand identity for the Quad Cities market and never joined the Convocom microwave network and control facilities in Peoria as originally envisioned in the 1970s design. Western Illinois University-Quad Cities assumed ownership of WQPT in 2010 and began a series of capital improvements. On June 30, 2014, the master control for WQPT was migrated and centralized at WTVP in Peoria, as envisioned in the original 1970s D.L. Markley & Associates design.

WJPT in Jacksonville signed on August 11, 1984, to serve the western portion of the Champaign–Springfield–Decatur market and south-central Illinois. This gave the central Illinois region the distinction of being served by two separately programmed PBS stations since WILL-TV in Urbana continued to serve as the PBS outlet for the eastern half of the market. Springfield is assigned to the Champaign–Springfield–Decatur market by Nielsen Designated Market Area (DMA) and the FCC Television Market Area (TMA) since the 1950s.

WIUM-TV in Macomb signed on October 1, 1984, as the primary station serving Macomb, WIU, and west-central Illinois.

WQEC in Quincy signed on March 9, 1985, serving Hannibal and Quincy, western Illinois, northeastern Missouri, and southeastern Iowa.

WTVP in Peoria, owned by the Illinois Valley Public Telecommunications Corporation (IVPT), signed on June 27, 1971, serving the Galesburg, Peoria, and Bloomington television markets. IVPT elected to keep its brand identity, board ownership structure, and broadcast operations in Peoria. Like WQPT, the station never elected to join the three newly built Convocom broadcast facilities in Macomb, Quincy, and Jacksonville outlined in the Markley plan.

Springfield Public TV Opportunity
After World War II, frequency channels (VHF and UHF) were being assigned by FCC Engineering staff for television stations.  Unfortunately, local television was non-existent in Springfield before July 1953.

In October 1948 the Freeze of 1948 occurred, with channel 2 (VHF) moved from Springfield to St. Louis.  Channel 8 (VHF) was eventually moved from Peoria to Moline by 1963.  Springfield was assigned channel 52 (UHF) for future educational television.
Springfield community never created a local educational television station in the 1950s or 1960s, but instead relied upon WILL-TV, Urbana, IL for educational programming.

Smaller network and change in mission
Over the next ten years, regional, political, and consortium membership change led to revisions in financial support and a different mission statement.  Convocom's service region in 1985 was smaller than the original 1970s D.L. Markley & Associates design. In 1989, Dr. Jerold Gruebel argued that Convocom offices in Springfield would permit access to Illinois legislators as well as the Illinois Board of Higher Education to further a new mission statement for Convocom: "To collaborate with people and enterprises in the communities we serve to bring quality programs, learning opportunities, and economic development to our region."

Over the next 6 years (1989-1995) Dr. Gruber began a realignment of Convocom and its original vision.  
1. Relocate offices from Peoria to Springfield, to pursue state lobbying (IL Board Higher Education).
2. Reduce higher education institution participation.
3. Create a new marketing and branding program (Network Knowledge).
4. Change FCC call signs of broadcast facilities to match: WIUM-TV became WMEC and WJPT became WSEC.

On July 1, 1995, Governor Jim Edgar signed a bill which realigned the public higher educational structure in Illinois. The Board of Regents and Board of Governors were abolished. Sangamon State University was merged with the University of Illinois system as the University of Illinois Springfield. 
Western Illinois University was expanded to a dual campus, single university structure with the creation of a new Western Illinois University-Quad Cities campus. This dual-campus for WIU as a public-private partnership was modeled after University of Illinois and Southern Illinois University multi-campus structures.
John Deere, the Moline Foundation, IBM, and the Rock Island County Board provided land grants, facilities support, and resources for this new WIU riverfront campus in Moline. Before 1995, the Quad Cities was the largest metropolitan region in the U.S. without a public four-year university.

New Broadcast Architecture 
In 1997, Convocom purchased 30 acres of land southeast of Colchester, near Fandon, for a new  tower. The WMEC transmitter was moved to this new tower. This transmitter relocation ended WIU's co-location support for WMEC at the WIUM-FM tower location (1983–1997) on WIU's Horn Campus, south of Macomb.

In 1998, in order to address reception problems in Springfield from WSEC at Waverly, a 1,400-watt translator was built in the city, originally broadcasting on channel 65 as W65BV. Previously, Springfield viewers could only get an acceptable signal via cable and satellite. This translator was moved to VHF channel 8 in 2001 and became W08DP.

On July 21, 2000, Convocom filed with the FCC a request for a Waiver of Section 73.1125. This waiver request was to relocate the master control and technical and engineering facilities from Peoria to Chatham, southwest of Springfield. This eventual approval by FCC effectively ended the original 1970s design and would have financial consequences in the next decade. WILL-TV in Champaign-Urbana is the recognized primary PBS member for Springfield, with WSEC as a secondary affiliate.  The FCC, Nielsen, and PBS continue to recognize Macomb's WMEC as Network Knowledge's flagship station.
In 2013, an experimental collaboration involving joint management and operational cooperation of WTVP with WILL-TV and the University of Illinois worked well enough that the WTVP Board of Directors voted in December 2013 to extend this cooperative agreement for an additional three years. The overall purpose of the agreement is to help both public broadcasting stations operate more cost-effectively in serving eastern and central Illinois.

In July 2008, WQPT, owned by Black Hawk College, an original member of the Convocom consortium, lost financial support when the station was removed from the college's FY2009 fiscal budget.

In May 2010, WQPT was sold to Western Illinois University-Quad Cities (WIU-QC), with the primary objective to return WQPT to its original mission of creating more local and public affairs programming. The station moved from its longtime home on Black Hawk's campus to new studios and offices in Riverfront Hall on the WIU-QC Campus on July 1, 2014. WQPT-TV was added to cable television systems serving Macomb and McDonough County after the WQPT transmitter was relocated to Orion, Illinois, in 2002 and later in 2010 when ownership changed to WIU-QC. The Macomb and McDonough County cable television systems have carried KIIN Iowa Public TV and WTVP in Peoria since 1969.

On June 30, 2014, WQPT centralized its master control at WTVP, in Peoria, as planned by D. L. Markley and Associates in the original Convocom network plan.

The smaller, three station Network Knowledge network relied heavily on corporate and government grant funding, instead of membership support (only six percent of the viewing audience donates to the three stations). In contrast, Friends of Iowa Public Television (Iowa Public Television Foundation Board) was created in 1970 for the development, growth, and support through building a strong statewide membership base. Its 65,000 member households across Iowa and bordering states contributed nearly 90 percent of the out-of-pocket costs for acquiring and producing general audience programming.

References

Television channels and stations established in 1984
Television channels and stations established in 1985
1976 establishments in the United States